Golczewo  (formerly ) is a town in Kamień County, West Pomeranian Voivodeship, Poland, with 2,718 inhabitants (2004).

Points of interest

External links

Official town webpage
 Jewish Community in Golczewo on Virtual Shtetl

Cities and towns in West Pomeranian Voivodeship
Kamień County